The Schosshalden cemetery (in German: Schosshaldenfriedhof) is a cemetery at Ostermundigenstrasse 116 in Bern.

Overview 

It lies on the border to the Ostermundigen municipality, has been opened in 1877 as a replacement for the rose garden and then extended several times. It has rare wild plants, many species of birds, bats and small animals. A nature trail provides information on over 200 trees and shrubs.

The Schosshaldenfriedhof contains the family grave of Paul Klee, with a bronze plaque and the following quote:

I cannot be grasped in the here and now. For I reside just as much with the dead as with the unborn. Somewhat closer to the heart of creation than usual. But not nearly close enough.

The Schosshaldenfriedhof appears in Friedrich Dürrenmatt′s The Judge and His Hangman as the burial place of the murdered fictional character Police Lieutenant ″Ulrich Smith″ (or ″Dr. Prantl″).

Museum graveyard 

A museum graveyard (Museumsgrabfeld) has been created within the Schosshalde cemetery in 1980 in order to preserve aesthetically representative gravestones of different epochs. It is considered as Bern′s smallest museum and hosts cultural events.

Prominent burials

Existing burials 

 Erwin Friedrich Baumann (1890–1980), architect and sculptor
 Friedrich Baumann (1835v1910), architect and politician
 Markus Feldmann (1897–1958), Federal Council
 Otto von Greyerz (1863–1940), linguist
 Paul Klee (1879–1940), painter
 Ernst Kreidolf (1863–1956), painter and illustrator
 Eugen Meier (1930–2002), football player
 Marcel Perincioli (1911–2005), sculptor
 Karl Rappan (1905–1996), football player
 Eduard von Steiger (1881–1962), Federal Council
 Rudolf von Tavel (1866–1934), writer

Cleared burials 

 Edward John Granet (1858–1918), British military attache, Bern - reburied in Commonwealth war grave plot at St Martin's Cemetery, Vevey
 Gertrud Kurz (1890–1972), humanist
 Franz Eugen Schlachter (1859–1911), Bible translator
 Adolf Wölfli (1864–1930), painter

Notes 

Tourist attractions in Bern
Cemeteries in Switzerland
1877 establishments in Switzerland